The Territory of Mississippi was an organized incorporated territory of the United States that existed from April 7, 1798, until December 10, 1817, when the western half of the territory was admitted to the Union as the State of Mississippi. The eastern half was redesignated as the Alabama Territory until it was admitted to the Union as the State of Alabama on December 14, 1819. The Chattahoochee River played a significant role in the definition of the territory's borders. The population rose in the early 1800s from settlement, with cotton being an important cash crop.

History
The United States and Spain disputed these lands east of the Mississippi River until Spain relinquished its claim with the Treaty of Madrid, initially signed in 1795 by the two countries' representatives. The Mississippi Territory was organized in 1798 from these lands, in an area extending from 31° N latitude to 32°28' North — or approximately the southern half of the present states of Alabama and Mississippi.

The state of Georgia maintained a claim over almost the entire area of the present states of Alabama and Mississippi (from 31° N to 35° N), until it surrendered its claim in 1802 following the Yazoo land scandal. In 1804, Congress extended the boundaries of the Mississippi Territory to include all of the Georgia cession. 

Beginning about 1808 the legislature of the Mississippi Territory held its official meetings in one of the houses owned by Charles DeFrance of the Natchez District. The DeFrance house, also known as Assembly Hall, was located in Washington, Mississippi, about 10 miles from the city of Natchez.

In 1812, declaring that it had been included in the Louisiana Purchase (1803), the United States annexed the Mobile District of West Florida, between the Perdido River and the Pearl River. Spain disputed this and maintained its claim over the area. The following year, a Federal statute was secretly enacted authorizing the President to take full possession of this area with the use of military force ("and naval force") as deemed necessary.  Accordingly, General James Wilkinson occupied this district with a military contingent; the Spanish colonial commandant offered no resistance. This annexation extended the Mississippi Territory south to the Gulf of Mexico, with the northern border being the boundary of the state of Tennessee, taking in all of what is now Alabama and Mississippi.

Federal statutes enacted on March 1 and 3, 1817, provided a plan for the division of the Mississippi Territory into the state of Mississippi in the west and the Alabama Territory in the east (with St. Stephens, on the Tombigbee River, as the temporary seat of the Alabama territorial government).
On December 10, 1817, the division was finalized when the western portion was admitted to the Union as Mississippi, the 20th state.

Borders
The final boundary between Georgia and Mississippi Territory was defined to follow the Chattahoochee River north from the border with Spanish Florida. However, the Chattahoochee's upper course veers northeast, deep into Georgia. So the boundary was defined to follow the river until it turned northeast, and from that point to follow a straight line north to the 35th parallel (whose role in state borders dates back to the split of North and South Carolina in 1730). The line was not run straight north but rather angled to meet the northern border of the territory one-third of the way west, leaving the other two-thirds for two future states, Alabama and Mississippi (their angled boundary stopped at the Tennessee River).

Congress delineated the boundary between Mississippi and Alabama by dividing the territory into approximately equal-sized parts, similar in size to Georgia. The agriculturally productive lands were divided by a straight line running south from the northwest corner of Washington County (as it was defined at the time) to the Gulf of Mexico. The border north of this point was angled westward in order to keep Mississippi and Alabama roughly equal in size. At its northern end, this angled border follows a short section of the Tennessee River. Congress chose this boundary because if the straight line had been run all the way to the Tennessee border Mississippi would have jurisdiction over a small piece of hilly land cut off from the rest of the state by the wide Tennessee River.

Settlement

The attraction of vast amounts of high quality, inexpensive cotton land attracted hordes of settlers, mostly from Georgia and the Carolinas, and from tobacco areas of Virginia and North Carolina at a time when growing tobacco barely made a profit. From 1798 through 1820, the population soared from less than 9,000 to more than 22,000. Migration came in two fairly distinct waves – a steady movement until the outbreak of the War of 1812, and a flood afterward from 1815 through 1819. The postwar flood was caused by various factors, including high prices for cotton, the elimination of Indian titles to much of the land, new and improved roads, and the acquisition of new direct outlets to the Gulf of Mexico. The first migrants were traders and trappers, then herdsmen, and finally planters. The uplands in the Southwest frontier developed a relatively democratic society.

In the 1810 United States census, 11 counties in the Mississippi Territory (8 in Mississippi and 3 in Alabama) reported the following population counts (after only 3 reported the following counts in the 1800 United States census):

Cotton
After 1800, the development of a cotton economy in the South changed the economic relationship of native Indians with whites and slaves in Mississippi Territory. As Native Americans ceded their lands to whites, they became more isolated from whites and blacks. A great wave of public sales of former Indian land plus white migration (with slaves) into Mississippi Territory guaranteed the dominance of the developing cotton agriculture.

Government
President John Adams appointed Winthrop Sargent as the first governor of the Mississippi Territory, effective from May 1798 to May 1801. William C. C. Claiborne (1775–1817), a lawyer and former Democratic-Republican Congressman from Tennessee (1797–1801), was governor and superintendent of Indian affairs in the Mississippi Territory from 1801 through 1803. Although he favored acquiring some land from the Choctaw and Chickasaw, Claiborne was generally sympathetic and conciliatory toward the Indians. He worked long and patiently to iron out differences that arose, and to improve the material well-being of the Indians. He was also partly successful in promoting the establishment of law and order, as when his offering of a two thousand dollar reward helped destroy a gang of outlaws headed by Samuel Mason (1750–1803). His position on issues indicated a national rather than regional outlook, though he did not ignore his constituents. Claiborne expressed the philosophy of the Republican Party and helped that party defeat the Federalists. When a smallpox epidemic broke out in the Spring of 1802, Claiborne's actions resulted in the first recorded mass vaccination in the territory and saved Natchez from the disease.

George Mathews, a former governor of Georgia, was appointed the governorship, though the appointment was revoked before he took office. The third governor was Robert Williams, serving from May 1805 to March 1809. 

David Holmes was the last governor of the Mississippi Territory, 1809–17. Holmes was generally successful in dealing with a variety of matters, including expansion, land policy, Indians, the War of 1812, and the constitutional convention of 1817 (of which he was elected president). Often concerned with problems regarding West Florida, he had a major role in 1810 in negotiations which led to the peaceful occupation of part of that territory. McCain (1967) concludes that Holmes' success was not based on brilliance, but upon kindness, unselfishness, persuasiveness, courage, honesty, diplomacy, and intelligence.

The eastern half of the Mississippi Territory was labeled the Tombigbee District and later Washington County. Ignored by the territorial government, the inhabitants were beset by hostile neighbors, militant Indians, and the usual frontier problems of competing land claims and establishment of law. Solutions to these difficulties came slowly, and were not completely resolved when the territory gained statehood as the U.S. state of Alabama in 1819.

Law
English common law dominated the development of the judicial system in the Mississippi Territory. The citizenry considered the laws imposed by Winthrop Sargent, the territory's governor, as repressive and unconstitutional. 'Sargent's Code,' however unpopular, established the first court system for the territory and served as the precedent for later revisions. The area was in a dire need of competent judges at the end of the 18th century, at a time when the governor and three judges were supposed to write law to govern the new territory. In 1798, Sargent wrote to Timothy Pickering, Secretary of State, that this was his "great source of uneasiness"; he was anxiously awaiting the arrival of a new judge, William McGuire--but McGuire, who did not get to the territory in the fall of 1799, went back to his home in Virginia after only a couple of weeks. The two other judges were Judge Tilton, a man who had never practiced law and may have studied law only for a year (he left after an early disagreement with the governor, returning later for a brief spell), and Judge Bruin, a merchant of whom Sargent said he was "a worthy and sensible man [but] beyond doubt deficient". "Aside from his innocence of legal knowledge, [he] was so often drunk or absent or both" (and had to resign to avoid impeachment), according to the reviewer of a 1954 study by William Baskerville Hamilton on Thomas Rodney, the federal judge who arrived in the territory in 1803 and helped organize it until his death in 1811.

An 1802 judiciary act considerably simplified the court system. Several judicial reorganization acts followed in 1805, 1809, and 1814, though a modified form of Sargent's county court system and the considerable power held by judges continued. While the credentials of the members of the first territorial court were questionable, the quality of judges in later courts steadily grew.

Religion
While the Roman Catholic Church, planted during the French and Spanish colonial periods, was active along the coast, after 1799 more American Protestants entered the territory, bringing their religious varieties with them. Free thought, skepticism, deism, or indifference to religion were characteristic of the wealthy planters and land speculators, as newcomers were far more interested in seeking riches in this world than in the next. As the number of American migrants increased, Methodists, Baptists, and Presbyterians formed the three leading denominations in the territory. Protestant ministers won converts, often promoted education, and had some influence in improving the treatment of slaves.

War of 1812
The people of the Mississippi Territory favored war with Britain in 1812. By 1810, belief in the national policy of economic coercion was waning in what was then called the Southwest, while desire for unrestricted trade and a vindication of national honor was rising, intermingled with desire for Spanish Florida. However, problems of land claims, Indians, internal improvements, and statehood issues continued to excite more local interest than the coming of war. Most saw no conflict between war issues and local interests; in fact, some foresaw war as a way of resolving certain local problems.

Following a successful attack on a white expedition at the Battle of Burnt Corn, the Red Sticks, a hostile faction of the Creeks, determined to attack and destroy Fort Mims in the eastern part Mississippi Territory (modern Alabama). Poor scouting, an attack at noon when most of the garrison was eating, seizure of the portholes by the Indians, and inability to close the main gates were all elements in the defeat on August 30, 1813. Of the 275 to 300 whites and multiracial people in Fort Mims at the time of the attack, between 20 and 40 escaped; therefore, about 235 to 260 whites and friendly Indians were killed in the battle. Creek losses were at least 100 killed.

The massacre had significant short- and long-range effects. It triggered a major Indian war that involved a substantial build-up of American military force in the area – which probably prevented the British from occupying an undefended Gulf coast in 1814. More importantly, relations between Americans and the southern Indians changed drastically. The Creeks, who had been living peacefully and in close contact with the settlers of the Mississippi Territory, lost more than half their land, and within twenty years were forced to move west of the Mississippi River.

Brigadier General Ferdinand L. Claiborne, commander of the Mississippi militia, was not to blame for the massacre, but Major Daniel Beasley was guilty of gross negligence. At the Battle of Horseshoe Bend on March 27, 1814, American forces and Indian allies under General Andrew Jackson defeated the Red Sticks, killing most of the warriors and sending the rest fleeing to Florida, where they joined the Seminole tribe.

Further reading
 Guice, John D. W. "The Cement of Society: Law in the Mississippi Territory," Gulf Coast Historical Review 1986 1(2): 76–99
 Hatfield, Joseph T. "Governor William Claiborne, Indians, and Outlaws in Frontier Mississippi, 1801–1803," Journal of Mississippi History 1965 27(4): 323–350
 Haynes, Robert V. "Territorial Mississippi, 1798–1817," Journal of Mississippi History 2002 64(4): 283–305
 Haynes, Robert V. "Historians and the Mississippi Territory," Journal of Mississippi History 1967 29(4): 409–428, historiography
 Haynes, Robert Vaughn. The Mississippi Territory and the Southwest Frontier, 1795–1817 (University Press of Kentucky; 2010) 431 pages
 Lowery, Charles D. "The Great Migration to the Mississippi Territory, 1798–1819," Journal of Mississippi History 1968 30(3): 173–192
 Moore, Margaret Deschamps. "Protestantism in the Mississippi Territory," Journal of Mississippi History 1967 29(4): 358–370
 Usner, Jr., Daniel H.  "American Indians on the Cotton Frontier: Changing Economic Relations with Citizens and Slaves in the Mississippi Territory," Journal of American History 1985 72(2): 297–317 in JSTOR

See also

Chickasaw
Choctaw
Creek (people)
Historic regions of the United States
History of Alabama
History of Mississippi
Mobile District
Territorial evolution of the United States

References

External links
Mississippi Territory Profile and Videos - Chickasaw.TV

 
Pre-statehood history of Alabama
Pre-statehood history of Mississippi